Richard Sibson is the name of

 Richard B. Sibson (1911–1994), New Zealand ornithologist
 Richard H. Sibson (born 1945), New Zealand geologist